Euvacusus is a genus of antlike flower beetles in the family Anthicidae. There is one described species in Euvacusus, E. coloradanus.

References

Further reading

 

Anthicidae
Articles created by Qbugbot